= Roulong =

Snack food of Beijing, China

Roulong is a traditional snack in Beijing, China. It is also popular in Tianjin, Hebei and other places. Old Beijing roulong, also known as lanlong, is a specialty noodle dish in old Beijing. The so-called "lanlong" is a long roll made by steaming steamed dough. The method is to roll the dough thin into long slices, put the mixed meat filling on top, and then roll it into long strips. It is then placed in a steamer, steamed, and cut open.
